The 2015 Club Atlético Boca Juniors season was the 86th consecutive Primera División season. During the season Boca Juniors took part in the Primera División, Copa Argentina and Copa Libertadores.

Season overview

December

December 5:  Mariano Echeverría finished his contract with Boca.
December 10:  Leonardo Suárez signed for Villarreal from Boca for €2 million.
December 29:  Roma exercised an option to purchase Leandro Paredes outright for €4.5 million.

 Pablo Pérez signed for Boca from Málaga on an 18-month loan for €200,000.

December 31:  Hernán Grana finished the loan with Boca and returned to All Boys.

 Pablo Ledesma finished his contract with Boca.

January
January 3:  Guillermo Sara signed for Boca as a free agent, for €500,000. The last team of the goalkeeper was Real Betis.
January 4:  Nahuel Zárate signed for Godoy Cruz on a one-year loan.

 Cristian Pavón returned from Colón after a loan spell.

January 5: Juan Forlín returned to Al Rayyan after a loan spell.

A new third uniform was presented.

January 10: Joel Acosta signed for Olimpo on a one-year loan.
January 11:  Emanuel Insúa signed for Udinese from Boca for €2,532,800.
January 14: On the first friendly of the season, Boca played against Ferrocarril Sud, winning 3–0.
January 16:  Alexis Rolín signed for Boca from Málaga on an 18-month loan .
January 17:  Manuel Vicentini signed for Sarmiento on a one-year loan.

On the first match of Copa Ciudad de Mar del Plata, Boca played against Racing Club, it was a 1–4 defeat, with great problems in defense and two players sent off (Erbes and Marín).

January 18:  Marco Torsiglieri signed for Boca from Metalist Kharkiv on a one-year loan.
January 20:On the second match of Copa Ciudad de Mar del Plata, Boca played against Vélez Sarsfield, it was a 2–2 draw.
January 21:  Sebastián D'Angelo signed for Tigre from Boca.

Boca draw another friendly, this time 0–0 against Emelec from Ecuador.

January 22:  Gino Peruzzi signed for Boca from Catania for €3.5 million and the complete purchase of Gonzalo Escalante.

  Fabián Monzón signed for Boca from Catania on a one-year loan.

January 24:  Luciano Acosta signed for Estudiantes de La Plata on a one-year loan.

On the first friendly Superclasico, on the Copa Julio Humberto Grondona Boca defeated River Plate 1–0 with Franco Cristaldo scoring the goal, the match ended with 3 players sent off: Cubas from Boca and Vangioni and Maidana from River.

January 25:Cristian Pavón suffered the fracture of the Fifth metatarsal bone after a tackle from Leonel Vangioni. Pavón will be out two months.
January 26: After the injury of Pavón it was decided that Sebastián Palacios would return to Boca after being loaned to Arsenal de Sarandí.
January 28:Boca played against Vélez Sarsfield the most important match of the pre-season: the playoff to qualify to the 2015 Copa Libertadores. It was a 1–0 win, with Nicolás Colazo scoring a great goal. Boca will play in the Group 5 against Zamora, Montevideo Wanderers and a qualified team from First Stage (winner G5).
January 31:On the second friendly Superclasico, on the Copa Luis B. Nofal, Boca defeated River with an historic result: it was a 5–0 win, with Franco Cristaldo, Sebastián Palacios, Andrés Chávez, Jonathan Calleri and Rodrigo Betancur scoring. River had a bad night and Mayada, Gutiérrez and Sánchez were sent off.

February
February 4:  Claudio Pérez signed for Belgrano on a one-year loan.
February 5:  Nicolás Lodeiro  signed for Boca from Corinthians for €2,479,480.

Boca played two friendlies against Barracas Central, winning both: 2–1 and 1–0.

February 10:The draw of Copa Argentina took place and Boca willa have to play against Huracán Las Heras from the Torneo Federal B.

Alexis Rolín suffered the Strain of his right Quadriceps. He will be out one month.

February 11:  Daniel Osvaldo  signed for Boca from Southampton F.C. on a 6-month loan.
February 15: On the Round 1 of Primera División, Boca played against Olimpo. On the first match of the tournament Boca won 3–1 with Fernando Gago and Sebastián Palacios scoring the goals.
February 18: In their first Copa Libertadores match, Boca won 2–0 in Chile against Palestino.
February 22: On the Round 2 of Primera División, Boca played against Temperley. It was a 2–0 victory in a match where Agustín Orión was sent off in the end of the first half.
February 26: In their second Copa Libertadores group stage match, Boca won 2–1 against Montevideo Wanderers.
February 27:  Emanuel Gigliotti signed for Chongqing Lifan on a 6-month loan for €669,051.

March
March 1: On the Round 3 of Primera División, Boca played against Atlético de Rafaela, winning 1–0 with Jonathan Calleri scoring the only goal.
March 8: On the Round 4 of Primera División, Boca played against Colón, and the game ended 1–1.
March 11: In their third Copa Libertadores group stage match, Boca won 5–0 against Zamora in a great match of the team.
March 14: On the Round 5 of Primera División, Boca played against Defensa y Justicia, winning 2–1. Fernando Gago and Sebastián Palacios suffered the strain on his right and left leg, respectively.
March 17: In their fourth Copa Libertadores group stage match, Boca won 5–1 against Zamora in Venezuela.
March 22: On the Round 6 of Primera División, Boca played against San Martín (SJ), and the game ended 1–1.
March 29: On the Round 7 of Primera División, Boca played against Estudiantes (LP), playing a great match and winning 3–0.

April
April 5: On the Round 8 of Primera División, Boca played against Huracán, winning 2–0 with César Meli scoring twice.
April 9: In their fifth Copa Libertadores group stage match, Boca won 3–0 against Montevideo Wanderers in Uruguay. Cristian Erbes suffered the sprain of his left knee.
April 12: On the Round 9 of Primera División, Boca played against Nueva Chicago, the match ended 0–0.
April 16: In their last Copa Libertadores group stage match, Boca won 2–0 against Palestino. For the first time Boca won the 6 matches of the group and obtained the record of being the best team in a group stage of the history of Copa Libertadores.
April 19: On the Round 10 of Primera División, Boca played against Lanús, winning 3–1.

May
3 May: On the Round 11 of Primera División, Boca played against River Plate, the Superclásico winning 2–0.
7 May: In the first leg of Round of 16 of Copa Libertadores Boca was defeated by River Plate 1–0, the first defeat on the year.
11 May: On the Round 12 of Primera División, Boca played against Independiente, the match ended in a 1–1 draw.
14 May: On the second leg of Round of 16 of Copa Libertadores the game was suspended after River Plate players were attacked with tear gas by Boca Juniors fans when the squad returned to the field following halftime, with the match still 0–0 (River Plate leading 1–0 on aggregate).
24 May: On the Round 13 of Primera División, Boca played against Aldosivi, suffering a 0–3 defeat.
27 May: In the Round of 64 game of the Copa Argentina, Boca played against Huracán Las Heras, winning 2–0.
31 May: On the Round 14 of Primera División, Boca played against Vélez Sarsfield, suffering a 2–0 defeat.

June
June 7: On the Round 15 of Primera División, Boca played against Newell's Old Boys, winning 4–0. The tournament will continue in July, after a winter break.
June 19:  Emanuel Trípodi finished his contract with Boca.
June 25:  Guillermo Burdisso finished his contract with Boca and signed with Club León of Mexico.
June 27: On the first winter friendly in United States Boca played against Jacksonville Armada FC winning 4–2. Arruabarrena confirmed that Torsiglieri will not continue in Boca.
June 30:  Marco Torsiglieri finished the loan with Boca and returned to Metalist.

  Daniel Osvaldo finished the loan with Boca and returned to Southampton F.C.

July
July 1: On the second winter friendly in United States Boca played against Fort Lauderdale Strikers winning 3–0.
July 4: On the third and last winter friendly, Boca played against Deportivo Saprissa of Costa Rica, winning 1–0.
July 10:  Fernando Tobio signed for Boca from Palmeiras on a one-year loan.
July 12: On the Round 16 of Primera División, after a winter break, Boca played against Sarmiento, winning 1–0.
July 13: Carlos Tevez signed for Boca from Juventus F.C. for €0 and a two-year loan of Guido Vadalá.
July 15: Gonzalo Castellani signed for Lanús on a loan until the end of the season.
July 17: Juan Manuel Martínez cancelled his contract with Boca, after playing two years in the club.
July 18: On the Round 17 of Primera División, Boca played against Quilmes, winning 2–1 with a great goal of Jonathan Calleri who performed a rabona.
July 25: Chongqing Lifan used the purchase option on Emanuel Gigliotti, who was on a 6-month loan, after playing two years in the club.
July 26: On the Round 18 of Primera División, Boca played against Belgrano, winning 1–0.
July 29: In the Round of 32 game of the Copa Argentina, Boca played against Banfield, winning 3–0.

August
August 2: On the Round 19 of Primera División, Boca played against Unión, losing 3–4 in an incredible match.
August 5: Federico Carrizo signed for Cruz Azul on a loan until the end of the season.
August 16: On the Round 20 of Primera División, Boca played against Arsenal, winning 2–1 in Sarandí.
August 19: In the Round of 16 game of the Copa Argentina, Boca played against Guaraní Antonio Franco, winning 4–0.
August 23: On the Round 21 of Primera División, Boca played against Godoy Cruz, winning 2–0.
August 29: On the Round 22 of Primera División, Boca played against Gimnasia y Esgrima (LP), winning 2–1 in La Plata.

September
September 1: Boca made use of the option to purchase Pablo Pérez permanently for  €1,000,000 until 2019.
September 6: On the Round 23 of Primera División, Boca played against San Lorenzo, losing 1–0.
September 13: On the Round 24 of Primera División, Boca played against River Plate, the Superclásico winning 1–0.
September 19: On the Round 25 of Primera División, Boca played against Argentinos Juniors, winning 3–1 in La Paternal.
September 23: In the Quarterfinals game of the Copa Argentina, Boca played against Defensa y Justicia, winning 2–1.
September 27: On the Round 26 of Primera División, Boca played against Banfield, winning 3–0.

October
October 4: On the Round 27 of Primera División, Boca played against Crucero del Norte, winning 1–0.
October 10:On the last friendly Superclasico, River Plate defeated Boca 1–0 with Lucho González scoring the goal, the match was played in Córdoba.
October 19: On the Round 28 of Primera División, Boca played against Racing, losing 3–1.
October 23: In the Semifinals game of the Copa Argentina, Boca played against Lanús, winning 2–0 and advancing to the final.

November
November 1: On the Round 29 of Primera División, Boca clinched their 31st Argentine Primera División title after winning 1–0 against Tigre.
November 4: In the Final of the Copa Argentina, Boca played against Rosario Central, winning 2–0, Boca clinched their 3rd Copa Argentina title.
November 8: On the Round 30 of Primera División, the last round of the tournament, Boca played against Rosario Central in Rosario losing 3–1.

Current squad

Last updated on November 8, 2015

Transfers

Top scorers
Last updated on November 8, 2015

Top assists
Last updated on November 8, 2015

Penalties

Clean sheets
Last updated on November 8, 2015

Disciplinary record
Last updated on November 8, 2015

References

External links
 Club Atlético Boca Juniors official web site 

Club Atlético Boca Juniors seasons
Argentine football clubs 2015 season